Saint-Cézaire-sur-Siagne (literally Saint-Cézaire on Siagne) is a commune in the Alpes-Maritimes department in southeastern France.

Geography
Far from the major thoroughfares, Saint-Cézaire-sur-Siagne lies halfway between the beaches of the Côte d'Azur and the ski resorts of the Maritime Alps. It is located on a plateau at 475 m. Protected from north winds by the alpine foothills around Grasse, it enjoys an exceptionally tempered climate.

Saint-Cézaire-sur-Siagne is located in the western part of Alpes-Maritimes, perched on a spur that dominates the valley of the Siagne.

Saint-Cézaire lies 15 km southwest of Grasse, 30 km from Cannes, and 52 km from Nice.

On the north are Escragnolles and Saint-Vallier-de-Thiey. To the south are Spéracèdes and Le Tignet. On the southwest are the valley of the Siagne and the massif of Tanneron, which forms the boundary between Alpes-Maritimes and the department of Var.

Population

See also
Communes of the Alpes-Maritimes department

References

Communes of Alpes-Maritimes
Alpes-Maritimes communes articles needing translation from French Wikipedia